The Sepree River is a short mountain river that is sourced deep within the Kouga mountain range in South Africa.  Roughly 15 kilometers from its source, it flows into the larger Kouga River. It starts up near Saptokop peak and flows east approximately 5 km before turning south for 10 or so kilometers. At the confluence with the Kouga River, it had to cut through a 30 m high section of sandstone. This small canyon is only 20 m wide. The temperature of the especially clear water averages 16 degrees Celsius annually.

Rivers of the Eastern Cape